The 2013 NCAA Division I women's volleyball tournament began on December 5, 2013 and ended on December 21, 2013 at KeyArena in Seattle, Washington. The NCAA selection show was televised on Sunday, December 1, 2013.

Qualifying teams
The champions of the NCAA's 32 conferences qualify automatically. Twenty-two conferences hold tournaments, while the other ten award their automatic bid on the basis of being the league's regular-season champion. Those that do not hold tournaments are the Atlantic Coast, American Athletic, Big 12, Big West, Big Ten, Ivy League, Mountain West, Pac-12, Southeastern and West Coast Conferences. The other 32 bids are apportioned on an at-large basis. Only the top 16 teams overall are seeded.

Records

Bracket
The first two rounds were held on campus sites (the home court of the seeded team). Regional semifinals and finals were held at pre-determined sites. In 2013, those sites were hosted by Nebraska, Illinois, USC, and Kentucky, all of whom made the tournament and hosted in the first two rounds. Unlike the NCAA basketball tournament, where teams cannot be placed into regionals that they host, the selectors in the volleyball tournament were required to place qualifying teams in their 'home' regionals, in order to reduce travel costs.

Lincoln, Nebraska Regional

Champaign, Illinois Regional

Los Angeles, California Regional

Lexington, Kentucky Regional

Final Four

Final Four All-Tournament Team:
Micha Hancock - Penn State (Most Outstanding Player)
Ariel Scott - Penn State
Deja McClendon - Penn State
Katie Slay - Penn State
Deme Morales - Wisconsin
Lauren Carlini - Wisconsin
Krista Vansant - Washington

Record by conference

*Four tournament matches featured one Big Ten team against another, and likewise one featured one Pac-12 team against another. Each of those matches is counted as one win and one loss for the respective conference.

The columns R32, S16, E8, F4, CM, and NC respectively stand for the Round of 32, Sweet Sixteen, Elite Eight, Final Four, Championship Match, and National Champion.

The America East, American Athletic, Atlantic 10, Atlantic Sun, Big Sky, Big South, Colonial Athletic, Conference USA, Horizon League, Ivy League, Metro Atlantic, Mid-American, Mid-Eastern Athletic, Missouri Valley, Mountain West, Northeast, Ohio Valley, Southern, Southland, Southwestern Athletic, Summit League, Sun Belt and Western Athletic Conferences all qualified one team which lost in the first round.

References

NCAA Women's Volleyball Championship
NCAA
Sports competitions in Seattle
NCAA Division I Women's Volleyball
NCAA Division I women's volleyball tournament
NCAA Division I women's volleyball tournament
NCAA Division I women's volleyball tournament
Volleyball in Washington (state)